Samantha Zoe Womack (née Janus; born 2 November 1972) is an English actress, singer, model and director who has worked in film, television and stage. Womack initially planned a career in singing and she represented the United Kingdom in the 1991 Eurovision Song Contest. Her song for the contest, "A Message to Your Heart", was released as her first (and only) single in April 1991 and reached number 30 in the UK Singles Chart.

Womack made her name in the mid-1990s with her role as Mandy Wilkins in Game On (1995-1998) leading onto roles in the BBC One drama Pie in the Sky (1995–1996) and the sitcom Babes in the Wood (1998). She has since become known for playing the role of Ronnie Mitchell in EastEnders (2007–2011, 2013–2017). Her portrayal of Ronnie gained her more prominence and acting roles after some time out of the limelight. She also played Tanya Porter in Sky One comedy-drama Mount Pleasant from 2013 until the final episode in 2017. Womack has also toured across the United Kingdom playing Morticia in the stage musical The Addams Family.

Early life
Womack was born in Brighton. Her singer-songwriter father, Noel Janus (born Janes), left the family when she was six, and soon after, her model-actress mother, Diana O'Hanlon, married a doctor and the family moved to Edinburgh.

Womack lived on the QE2 with her choreographer grandmother, Sheila Holt (a former actress and choreographer to magician David Nixon for a short time). Womack has a younger half-sister, Zoe. During an appearance on Big Star's Little Star in 2014, it was revealed that she attended the same school as members of All Saints, sisters Nicole and Natalie Appleton, before going to the Sylvia Young Theatre School in London, where she met future EastEnders co-star Danniella Westbrook.At the age of 15, as a self-confessed ‘wild child’, she left home for a life squatting, drinking, smoking and taking drugs.

Womack is the niece of Angie Best, her father's sister and former wife of footballer George Best. Angie's son, Calum Best, is Womack's cousin. As revealed on an episode of Who Do You Think You Are? in 2012, Womack's great-great-grandmother Jessie Ryder was an actress in New York City in the early 20th century.

Career

Eurovision and early career
The actress first came to prominence in March 1991 aged 18, when she won the annual A Song for Europe competition to represent the United Kingdom in the Eurovision Song Contest. She finished joint tenth and the song, "A Message to Your Heart", peaked at number 30 on the UK Singles Chart. Despite her achievements, her entry into the Eurovision is frequently remarked upon. She has said regarding the experience that her failure in the contest devastated her at the time and thought it would spell the end of her career. She has also called her appearance 'ridiculous', in that she was dressed in a pink mini-dress while singing about starving children and says the lyrics of the song are burned into her memory forever.

Womack developed her first love of acting, appearing in episodes of The Bill and Press Gang; in 1993 she appeared in Demob with Griff Rhys Jones and Martin Clunes; and took to the West End stage, replacing Debbie Gibson as Sandy in Grease.

From 1994 to 1998 Womack played Mandy in the BBC Two sitcom Game On opposite Ben Chaplin (later replaced by Neil Stuke). She remained on the show until its end in 1998. In between series of Game On, she had a part in the BBC One drama Pie in the Sky from 1995 to 1996 as Nicola Dooley, a waitress.

Womack then appeared in the pilot for The Grimleys with Jack Dee, and the film Up 'n' Under with Neil Morrissey. In 1998 she starred in the ITV1 series Liverpool 1 with her future husband Mark Womack. She then returned to comedy in the sitcom Babes in the Wood co-starring another Sylvia Young Theatre School student, Denise van Outen, it was critically panned despite respectable ratings, and Womack left after the first series.

In 2002 Womack starred as Cinderella in the ITV Christmas pantomime alongside Harry Hill, Alexander Armstrong, Frank Skinner, Paul Merton, Ronnie Corbett and many more.

A popular choice for photo shoots in men's magazines such as FHM, she came 21st in the FHM 100 Sexiest Women in the World poll in 1998 and 41st in 1999.

Smaller roles
In 1990, she appeared as a guest in two episodes of the CITV comedy sitcom Spatz; Series 1 Episode 2 and 3. It is rumoured that a possible falling out may have occurred leading to her swift exit from the show after such a brief stint. This is fuelled by her reluctance to admit for many years that she was part of the show.

In 2002 she returned to TV in BBC One drama Strange and she appeared in films The Baby Juice Express, Lighthouse Hill and Dead Man's Cards.

In January 2005 she narrated Jordan & Peter: Laid Bare for ITV2. She later directed an anti-bullying music video for Liverpool band Just 3, entitled Stand Tall. The video starred her and Liverpool F.C. footballer Jamie Carragher. The video was heavily backed by Childline ambassador Esther Rantzen.

In 2006, Womack starred in the BBC One comedy Home Again as Ingrid, and as Miss Adelaide in the West End production of the musical Guys and Dolls at London's Piccadilly Theatre, initially with Patrick Swayze and then Miami Vice star Don Johnson. She reprised the role at the Sunderland Empire opposite Alex Ferns in 2007.

EastEnders
On 11 May 2007 it was announced that she would be joining EastEnders as Ronnie Mitchell, a cousin of the well known Mitchell brothers. She had previously appeared in the soap in a minor role as a girlfriend of Simon Wicks.

During her first stint, Womack's character Ronnie was central to many storylines including the controversial baby-swap story which was aired during 2011. It was reported that this is the reason why Womack quit the soap, although this has never been confirmed. Womack made her final appearance as Ronnie on 7 July 2011 when the character was sent to prison.

Since appearing on EastEnders she has made regular television appearances on Friday Night with Jonathan Ross, The Paul O'Grady Show, Richard & Judy and Loose Women. In November 2007, she sang with EastEnders co-stars in the 2007 Children in Need charity appeal.

In May 2013, it was confirmed that Womack would return to EastEnders as Ronnie Mitchell. Womack's character Ronnie Mitchell was later killed off on the episode broadcast 1 January 2017 when she was trying to save Roxy Mitchell from drowning and drowned herself.  Her last appearance was on the episode broadcast 19 January 2017 when Ronnie was shown as a corpse lying in her coffin.

Theatre and continued success
In 2011 Womack played the lead role, Ensign Nellie Forbush, a US Navy nurse from Little Rock, Arkansas, in the Lincoln Center production of Rodgers and Hammerstein's musical South Pacific at the Barbican Theatre in London. In March 2013, Womack starred opposite her husband on stage in the world premiere of Hope at the Royal Court Theatre in Liverpool.

From September 2013, Womack played the regular role of Tanya in series three of Sky Living's Mount Pleasant. She continued in this role until the final episode in 2017. Altogether, Womack appeared in 25 episodes as Tanya Dawson (later Porter when the character married).

In 2015, she appeared in the film Kingsman: The Secret Service as lead actor Taron Egerton's character's mother. This was Womack's first main role in such a high-profile film. In 2017 Womack reprised the role in a smaller appearance in Kingsman: The Golden Circle.

In 2017, Womack toured as Morticia Adams in the musical-comedy Addams Family as Morticia around the UK and Ireland. She was announced to reprise the role in 2021 for a tour around  UK  and Ireland, however she did not reprise the role on tour for unknown reasons. The role of Morticia Addams was instead played by Strictly Come Dancing champion Joanne Clifton

In September 2018, it was announced that she would be playing Fairy Bow Bells in the pantomime Dick Whittington.

Womack appeared in Silent Witness in early 2019. On an episode of Loose Women in February 2019, Womack confirmed that offers had been made to her about a project with co-star and best friend Rita Simons. In response to this, they both said that they would wait for the right one to come along.

Other ventures
In January 2011 she appeared as one of the celebrity contestants on the BBC show The Magicians, working with magician Chris Korn. For her "celebrity's choice" trick, she chose being sawn in half by Korn in an illusion called Clearly Impossible. In March 2011 she appeared with Lenny Henry, Angela Rippon and Reggie Yates in the BBC fundraising documentary for Comic Relief called Famous, Rich and in the Slums, where the four celebrities were sent to Kibera in Kenya, Africa's largest slum.

In November 2011, it was reported that Womack was in the running, alongside Dannii Minogue to become a judge on the 2012 series of Britain's Got Talent. However, it was later confirmed that the judging panel for series six would be Simon Cowell, Alesha Dixon, Amanda Holden and David Walliams. Womack has since confirmed that she was offered a place on the judging panel and that she had a meeting with Cowell in Los Angeles. She has said that although she was grateful, she rejected the offer as "it’s just not me".

In 2012 Womack appeared in series nine of the BBC's Who Do You Think You Are? The episode revealed her descent on her father's side from two musicians, her great grandfather Alexander Cunningham Ryan, his partner's father Pierre François Odilon Garraud, & Pierre's partner, an actress, Jessie Ryder.

In February 2013, she took part in All Star Family Fortunes, donating money to Comic Relief and ActionAid. 

Womack was interviewed on John Bishop: In Conversation With... in November 2017. This episode titled John Bishop: In Conversation With...Samantha Womack included an in depth conversation about her life and career. In February 2020, it was announced that Womack would be taking part in the challenge for Sport Relief. In 2021, she acted alongside Harry Potter actress Jessie Cave in the British sitcom Buffering.

Personal life
In 2007, Womack won "substantial" damages from the Sunday Sport newspaper over a story headlined "Sam's sex and drugs shame". She sued the Sport over an article published on 22 July, which claimed she had "coke fuelled threesomes" and took part in a "three-hour drug fuelled lesbian orgy".

In 2008, Womack raised controversy by speaking of having to stay thin in order to get work in the industry. "I go to bed hungry every night.... It's terrible and if I'm honest, yeah, it upsets me deeply. I miss being able to eat whatever want - I love food and love eating.
But if I've had a big dinner or gorged on the kids' leftovers I'll eat virtually nothing the next day. Maybe a bowl of porridge or a salad to try to even it out...I'm not a character actress... I'm known as a femme-fatale actress who's got older. If I let myself go and put on weight, no one would employ me.  

In September 2015, it was reported that she was "living in fear" and had alerted the police that she was being stalked. The stalker was given a suspended sentence in December, the same year.

Relationships
Janus married an Italian citizen Junfan Mantovani in 1997 after a long relationship. The relationship broke down and the couple divorced in 1998.

Womack began a relationship with Liverpool 1 co-star Mark Womack. They married in 2009 after ten years together. The couple have two children: son Benjamin Thomas Womack (born 2001) and daughter Lili-Rose Womack (born 2005). Mark Womack also has a son, Michael Womack, from a previous marriage. In 2009, Womack took her husband's surname and began to use it professionally. In August 2020, Womack announced that she and Mark had quietly separated in 2018, but that they are still living together in the same house with their children.

Womack and her husband Mark are best friends with Scott Maslen and his wife Estelle Rubio. They have known each other since they were teenagers. Maslen is godfather to Womack's two children and she is godmother to Maslen's son, Zak. They often go on holiday together with their children, which Womack revealed during an appearance on Friday Night with Jonathan Ross in January 2008. In late 2007 Maslen joined the cast of EastEnders as Jack Branning, who has a relationship with Womack's character, Ronnie. This was something that both Maslen and Womack were initially uncomfortable with when they read the scripts, with Maslen commenting in various interviews that having to kiss Womack was like having to kiss his sister. Womack is also best friends with her former EastEnders'' co-star Rita Simons, who played her sister Roxy Mitchell.

Health
In April 2008, Womack broke her shoulder when she tripped and fell down the stairs at her home while rushing to get ready for work.

On 8 August 2022, Womack paid tribute to Dame Olivia Newton-John following her death from breast cancer, and confirmed on Twitter that she had been diagnosed with breast cancer herself. In December 2022, Womack announced that she was now cancer free.

Filmography

Film

Television

Theatre credits

Discography
May 1991 "A Message to Your Heart" / "Heaven is a Place for Heroes"  (Hollywood Records), UK Singles Chart No. 30

Awards and nominations

References

External links

 
 
 
 
 

1972 births
Living people
Actresses from Brighton
Alumni of the Sylvia Young Theatre School
Eurovision Song Contest entrants for the United Kingdom
English expatriates in Italy
English film actresses
English people of French descent
English people of Irish descent
English soap opera actresses
English television actresses
English stage actresses
Eurovision Song Contest entrants of 1991
People from Brighton
People from Cardington, Bedfordshire
20th-century English actresses
21st-century English actresses
20th-century English women singers
20th-century English singers
21st-century English women singers
21st-century English singers